The United States Department of Defense was holding a total of eleven
Syrian detainees in Guantanamo.
A total of 778 suspects have been held in the Guantanamo Bay detention camps, in Cuba since the camps opened on January 11, 2002
The camp population peaked in 2004 at approximately 660.

Syrian detainees at Guantanamo

Wives
In 2008, Human Rights Watch reported:

References

External links
Ahmed Adnan Ahjam's Guantanamo detainee assessment via Wikileaks
Ali Husein Muhammad Shaaban's Guantanamo detainee assessment via Wikileaks
Abd Al Hadi Omar Mahmoud Faraj's Guantanamo detainee assessment via Wikileaks
Jihad Ahmed Mujstafa Diyab's (Abu Wa'el Dhiab's) Guantanamo detainee assessment via Wikileaks

Lists of Guantanamo Bay detainees by nationality
Syria–United States relations